Roberto Secundino Digón (25 July 1935 – 30 January 2022) was an Argentine politician and sports executive.

Biography
A member of the Justicialist Party, he served in the Argentine Chamber of Deputies from 1985 to 1989 and again from 1993 to 1997. 

He died of COVID-19 in Buenos Aires on 30 January 2022, at the age of 86.

1935 births
2022 deaths
Boca Juniors
20th-century Argentine politicians
Argentine football chairmen and investors
Members of the Argentine Chamber of Deputies elected in Buenos Aires Province
Justicialist Party politicians
People from Buenos Aires
Deaths from the COVID-19 pandemic in Argentina

References